George Horace Gallup (November 18, 1901 – July 26, 1984) was an American pioneer of survey sampling techniques and inventor of the Gallup poll, a successful statistical method of survey sampling for measuring public opinion.

Life and career

Gallup was born in Jefferson, Iowa, the son of Nettie Quella (Davenport) and George Henry Gallup, a dairy farmer. As a teen, George Jr., known then as "Ted", would deliver milk and used his salary to start a newspaper at the high school, where he also played football. His higher education took place at the University of Iowa, where he was a football player, a member of the Iowa Beta chapter of the Sigma Alpha Epsilon fraternity, and editor of The Daily Iowan, an independent newspaper which serves the university campus. He earned his B.A. in 1923, his M.A. in 1925 and his Ph.D. in 1928.

He then moved to Des Moines, Iowa, where he served as head of the Department of Journalism at Drake University until 1931. That year, he moved to Evanston, Illinois, as a professor of journalism and advertising at Northwestern University. The next year, he moved to New York City to join the advertising agency of Young and Rubicam as director of research (later serving as vice president from 1937 to 1947). He was also a professor of journalism at Columbia University, but he had to give up this position shortly after he formed his own polling company, the American Institute of Public Opinion (Gallup Poll), in 1935.

Gallup is often credited as the developer of public polling. In 1932, Gallup did some polling for his mother-in-law, Ola Babcock Miller, a candidate who was a long shot from winning a position as Iowa Secretary of State. With the Democratic landslide of that year, she won a stunning victory, furthering Gallup's interest in politics.

In 1936, his new organization achieved national recognition by correctly predicting, from the replies of only 50,000 respondents, that Franklin Roosevelt would defeat Alf Landon in the U.S. Presidential election. This was in direct contradiction to the widely-respected Literary Digest magazine whose poll based on over two million returned questionnaires predicted that Landon would be the winner. Not only did Gallup get the election right, he correctly predicted the results of the Literary Digest poll, as well as using a random sample smaller than theirs but chosen to match it.

Twelve years later, his organization had its moment of greatest ignominy, when it predicted that Thomas Dewey would defeat Harry S. Truman in the 1948 election, by between 5% and 15%; Truman won the election by 4.5%. Gallup believed the error was mostly due to his decision to end polling three weeks before Election Day, thus failing to account for Truman's comeback.

In 1947, he launched the Gallup International Association, an international association of polling organizations. With friends-cum-rivals Elmo Roper and Archibald Crossley, he was instrumental in the establishment of the Market Research Council, the National Council on Public Polls, and the American Association for Public Opinion Research. In 1948, with Claude E. Robinson, he founded Gallup & Robinson, an advertising research company.

In 1958, Gallup grouped all of his polling operations under what became The Gallup Organization.

Gallup died in 1984 of a heart attack at his summer home in Tschingel ob Gunten, a village in the Bernese Oberland of Switzerland. He was buried in Princeton Cemetery. His wife died in 1988, and their son, writer and pollster George Gallup Jr., died in 2011.

See also
Approval rating
The Gallup Organization
Gallup & Robinson
George H. Gallup House
Gallup International Association

 Pollsters
Archibald Crossley
Elmo Roper
Mervin Field
Louis Harris

References

Bibliography
 Cantril, Hadley. Gauging Public Opinion (1944)
 Cantril, Hadley and Mildred Strunk, eds. Public Opinion, 1935–1946 (1951), massive compilation of many public opinion polls from US, UK, Canada, Australia, and elsewhere. online
 Converse, Jean M. Survey Research in the United States: Roots and Emergence 1890–1960 (1987), the standard history
 Doktorov, Boris Z. "George Gallup: Biography and Destiny". Moscow: (2011)
 Foley, Ryan J., Gallup Papers Give Glimpse into US Polling History, Associated Press (2012) 
 Gallup, George. Public Opinion in a Democracy (1939)
Gallup, George, and Evan Hiill. The Secrets of Long Life (Geis Associates/Random House, 1960).
 Gallup, Alec M. ed. The Gallup Poll Cumulative Index: Public Opinion, 1935–1997 (1999) lists 10,000+ questions, but no results
 Gallup, George Horace, ed. The Gallup Poll; Public Opinion, 1935–1971 3 vol (1972) summarizes results of each poll.
 Hawbaker, Becky Wilson. "Taking 'the Pulse of Democracy': George Gallup, Iowa, and the Origin of the Gallup Poll". The Palimpsest 74(3) 98–118. Description of Gallup's Iowa years and their impact on his development.
 Lavrakas, Paul J. et al. eds. Presidential Polls and the News Media (1995)
 Moore, David W. The Superpollsters: How They Measure and Manipulate Public Opinion in America (1995)

 Rogers, Lindsay. The Pollsters: Public Opinion, Politics, and Democratic Leadership (1949)
 Traugott, Michael W. The Voter's Guide to Election Polls 3rd ed. (2004)
 Young, Michael L. Dictionary of Polling: The Language of Contemporary Opinion Research (1992)

External links

The Gallup Legacy, from Gallup & Robinson website
"Opinion: The Black & White Beans". Time. May 3, 1948.

1901 births
1984 deaths
20th-century American mathematicians
American Episcopalians
American statisticians
Burials at Princeton Cemetery
Columbia University faculty
Drake University faculty
Episcopalians from Iowa
People from Jefferson, Iowa
Pollsters
Public opinion
University of Iowa alumni